Bishop Jan Cieński (7 January 1905 – 26 December 1992) was a Roman Catholic clandestine prelate from Ukraine as an Auxiliary bishop of Archdiocese of Lviv and a single Roman Catholic prelate in Ukraine since 30 June 1967 until 16 January 1991, when a Roman Catholic hierarchy was reestablished in Ukraine.

Life
Bishop Cieński was born in the noble szlachta family of a politician Tadeusz Cieński and Maria (née countess Dzieduszycka) Cieńska in present-day Western Ukraine. His maternal grandfather was Polish landowner, naturalist, political activist, collector and patron of arts of Ukrainian origins Count Włodzimierz Dzieduszycki.

After graduation of the gymnasium education, future Bishop continued to study at the Agrarian Academy in Dubliany, with graduation in 1928, and subsequently joined Faculty of Low of the University of Lviv. After that he joined the Major Roman Catholic Theological Seminary in Lviv in 1933 and was ordained as priest on June 26, 1938, by Archbishop Bolesław Twardowski, while completed of the theological studies.

During 1938–1945 he served as an assistant priest in Zolochiv, in the same time worked as a chaplain of the Polish Home Army and clandestinely rescued Jews in the Holocaust persecution. In a period of the Polish population transfers (1944–1946) he remained in the Soviet Union and continued to serve as a parish priest in Zolociv (1945–1992) under the Communist persecution of the religion.

In 1962 Bishop Cieński was clandestinely appointed by Pope John XIII as an Auxiliary Bishop of the Archdiocese of Lviv. But his consecration happened only on June 30, 1967, when he was consecrated as bishop by Metropolitan Archbishop Stefan Cardinal Wyszyński and other prelates of the Roman Catholic Church privately in Gniezno, Poland.

Bishop Jan Cieński secretly ordained several Greek Catholic and Roman Catholic priests, one of them being Bishop Leon Malyi, auxiliary bishop of Archdiocese of Lviv.

References

1905 births
1992 deaths
People from Lviv Oblast
20th-century Polish nobility
People from the Kingdom of Galicia and Lodomeria
Ukrainian people of Polish descent
Polish Austro-Hungarians
University of Lviv alumni
Polish people who rescued Jews during the Holocaust
20th-century Roman Catholic bishops in Ukraine
Roman Catholic bishops in the Soviet Union